Bauhinia picta, known as the algodoncillo, casco de vaca, palo de orquídeas, or pata de vaca, is a species of plant in the family Fabaceae. It is found in Colombia, México,Panama, and Venezuela.

References

picta
Least concern plants
Taxonomy articles created by Polbot
Flora of Colombia
Flora of Panama
Flora of Venezuela